Pickup Truck Racing is an auto racing series, running in the United Kingdom, including races on road courses and (historically) ovals. It was the only racing series that raced on the Oval Circuit at Rockingham Motor Speedway until it closed in 2018.

History
Launched in 1997 by Sonny Howard, the Pickup Truck Racing series, intended to bring the American pickup truck culture to Europe, is for purpose-built  racing specials. They have a tubular space frame chassis, are powered by a 2-litre multi-valve twin-cam engine and weigh . The race trucks are designed to place an emphasis on driver ability.

In 2001, the Pickup series became the main support for the Rockingham-based oval SCSA (then called ASCAR) racing series. At this time the pickups were right hand drive in configuration and as such not permitted to race on the anti-clockwise 1.5-mile speedway. An oval course was created to allow the drivers to compete.

For the 2003 season, the pickups were converted to left hand drive and finally allowed onto the oval track, as can be seen.

Pickup Truck Racing is unique in 'big' oval racing, in that unlike e.g. NASCAR, the trucks have rain tyres, wipers and rear safety lights, and will race on the ovals in the wet. Speeds are about  slower than when racing in fully dry conditions.

Pickup Truck Racing is also the only racing series in the UK for which no race-by-race entry fees are charged. Mallory Park continues to host oval events in the series following the closure of Rockingham Motor Speedway.

Technical specification

Pickup Truck Racing is a single make series, and the trucks are governed by the Pickup Truck Racing regulations. The chassis is made by SHP Engineering, who are also responsible for the vehicle used in T Cars, a series for young drivers.

The main flexibility in the regulations comes in the choice of engine. From 2011 the trucks could be fitted with either a Vauxhall petrol injected 2-litre red top engine or a Ford Duratec engine, both of which are four-cylinder engines with a 2-litre capacity and 16 valves.

In 2010, the front end of the pickup trucks was changed with the choice of either an Isuzu Denver Max LE or a Ford Ranger front. Later in the year a Vauxhall front was then also introduced to the championship.

2017 race dates

Race format

Under normal circumstances race weekends follow the traditional format of practice and qualifying on the Saturday, and two races on Sunday. Qualifying is used to shake the car down and work on the setup, and to meet the MSA requirements for race entry of three qualifying laps, and not to set the starting grid.

The grid is set by reversing the top ten qualifiers (whoever qualifies 10th will be on pole, and whoever qualifies 1st will start from 10th). The top ten qualifiers also receive points, starting from 20 and decreasing by two for every place until 10th place, after which drivers receive zero points. Rookies always start from the rear of the grid as do competitors who have broken seals on controlled components such as differentials. Drivers can also elect to start from the back should they wish to do so.

At some circuits, qualifying takes place on Saturday morning, with the first race on Saturday afternoon and the second on Sunday.

Previous seasons

For the 2009 season, races took place on weekends between March and November. There were racing weekends at six different circuits; the majority of the races were held at Rockingham Motor Speedway but others were held at Brands Hatch, Thruxton, Silverstone, Pembrey, Donington Park and Oulton Park. Each round comprised two races, making a twenty-two round competition in total.

2009 saw a number of rule changes:

Qualifying

One qualifying session was held, split into two sections. The fastest ten drivers in the first session made up the first ten places on the grid, but in reverse qualification order. The second session was be the same, but for race two.

Success ballast

The podium finishers in each race were subject to the application of success ballast as follows:

1st: 30 kg
2nd: 20 kg
3rd: 10 kg

Ballast was applied up to a maximum of 70 kg. 10 kg was removed each time a truck finished outside of the top three.

Sprint/feature races

Two events hosted a Sprint/Feature race format, one at Rockingham and one at a road course.

The series continued to operate two championships: the Oval Championship and the Overall Championship.

Previous champions
Note: 1997 was the inaugural year and as such, races were not part of a championship.

Points system

Any other classified finishers receive 20 points and any non-finishers receive 10 points except in the case of disqualification.

References

External links
 
 SHP Engineering website

 
Stock car racing in the United Kingdom
Stock car racing series
Auto races in the United Kingdom
Auto racing series in the United Kingdom